Ellonby is a hamlet in the parish of Skelton, in the Eden district, in the English county of Cumbria.

To the north of the hamlet, at Hardrigg Hall, a ruined 14th century pele tower adjoins a 19th-century farmhouse.

See also

Listed buildings in Skelton, Cumbria

References 

Hamlets in Cumbria
Skelton, Cumbria